The University of East Africa was established on 29 June 1963 and served Kenya, Tanzania, and Uganda in the eastern African Great Lakes region. The University was originally instituted as an independent external college of the University of London. In 1970, it was split into three independent universities, which are now:
: University of Nairobi
: Makerere University
: University of Dar es Salaam

References

 
Education in Kenya
Education in Uganda
Education in Tanzania
Universities and colleges in Africa
Makerere University
University of Nairobi
University of Dar es Salaam
Educational institutions established in 1963